Torrefiel is a ward (barrio) of Valencia belonging to the district of Rascanya. It had 25961 inhabitants in 2016.

References

Geography of Valencia